The 1987–88 Richmond Spiders men's basketball team represented the University of Richmond in National Collegiate Athletic Association (NCAA) Division I college basketball during the 1987–88 season. Richmond competed as a member of the Colonial Athletic Association (CAA) under head basketball coach Dick Tarrant and played its home games at the Robins Center.

Richmond finished first in the CAA regular-season standings with an 11–3 conference record, and won the CAA tournament to earn an automatic bid to the 1988 NCAA tournament. In the opening round, the Spiders defeated Indiana, 72–69, and followed that with a 59–55 win over Georgia Tech to reach the Sweet Sixteen. Richmond lost to #1 ranked Temple, 69–47, in the East regional semifinals.

Roster

Schedule and results

|-
!colspan=9 style=| Regular season

|-
!colspan=9 style=| CAA Tournament

|-
!colspan=9 style=| NCAA Tournament

References

Richmond Spiders men's basketball seasons
Richmond
1987 in sports in Virginia
1988 in sports in Virginia
Richmond